Taiyanggong Area is an area and township on the north of Chaoyang District, Beijing, China. It borders Wangjing and Datun Subdistricts to the north, Jiangtai Township to the east, Maizidian, Zuojiazhuang and Xiangheyuan Subdistricts to the south, Heping Street and Xiaoguan Subdistrict to the west. In 2020, it has a population of 86,935.

The name of the township, Taiyanggong, was first given by the Qianlong Emperor to the region during the Qing dynasty. The region also used to host Taiyanggong Temple that was demolished in 1950s.

History

Administrative Divisions 
As of 2021, Taiyanggong Area has 15 subdivisions, including 12 communities and 3 villages:

See also 
 List of township-level divisions of Beijing

References 

Chaoyang District, Beijing
Areas of Beijing